Lars Erik Westerberg (born 1948) was the CEO and President of the Swedish automotive safety company Autoliv. He is now the chairman of the board.

His family, which also includes his brother and politician Per Westerberg, has run a family company for generations and the family controls considerable wealth.

References

1948 births
Living people
Swedish chief executives
Date of birth missing (living people)
Place of birth missing (living people)